Annamária Vicsek (born 1973) is a politician in Serbia from the country's Hungarian community. She has served two terms in the National Assembly of Serbia and is currently a secretary of state in Serbia's Ministry of Education, Science, and Technological Development. Vicsek is a member of the Alliance of Vojvodina Hungarians (Vajdasági Magyar Szövetség, VMSZ).

Early life and career
Vicsek was born in Subotica, in what was then the Socialist Autonomous Province of Vojvodina in the Socialist Republic of Serbia, Socialist Federal Republic of Yugoslavia. She received her primary and secondary school education in Novi Sad, graduated from the Bárczi Gusztáv Faculty of Special Needs Education in Budapest, and later took post-graduate studies at Eötvös Loránd University. In 2008, she received a master's degree in pedagogy from the University of Novi Sad. She is a speech therapist and development instructor and has designed a number of continuing education programs inclusive of children with special needs. Since 2010, she has led the developmental department at the Pedagogical Institute of Vojvodina in Novi Sad.

Politician
Vicsek joined the VMSZ in 2008 and has served on the presidency of its Novi Sad city board. She was given the sixth position on the party's electoral list in the 2012 Serbian parliamentary election and narrowly missed election when the list won five mandates. She received the same position in the 2014 parliamentary election and was elected to her first term when the party won six seats. The Serbian Progressive Party (Srpska napredna stranka, SNS) won a majority government in the 2014 cycle, and the VMSZ supported the administration in parliament. Vicsek was a member of the committee on education, science, technological development, and the information society; a member of the committee on labour, social affairs, social inclusion, and poverty reduction; a member of the health and family committee; a deputy member of the committee on constitutional affairs and legislation; a deputy member of the committee on the rights of the child; and a member of the parliamentary friendship groups with Denmark and Finland.

She was promoted to the fifth position on the VMSZ's list in the 2016 Serbian parliamentary election and missed election when the list fell to four mandates. The party again provided parliamentary support for the SNS-led administration, and in September 2016 Vicsek was appointed as a secretary of state in the education ministry. In this position, she was responsible for overseeing pre-school education, inclusion, education of minority communities and vulnerable groups, and the prevention and overcoming of violence and discrimination in education. She also played a leading role in co-ordinating the ministry's response to the COVID-19 pandemic in 2020.

The VMSZ led a successful drive to increase its voter turnout in the 2020 parliamentary election and won a record nine seats. Vicsek, who again appeared in the fifth position on the party's list, was elected to a second term. The SNS again won a majority victory. When the new administration was formed, Vicsek was appointed to a second term as a secretary of state in the education ministry and so resigned her seat in the assembly on 27 November 2020.

Vicsek was given the twelfth position on the VMSZ's electoral list in the 2022 parliamentary election and was not re-elected when the list won five seats.

References

1973 births
Living people
Politicians from Subotica
Politicians from Novi Sad
Members of the National Assembly (Serbia)
Alliance of Vojvodina Hungarians politicians